Black Heart White Soul  is a Hong Kong modern thriller serial produced by TVB. This series was featured in the TVB's 2014 Sales Presentation.

Synopsis
May Tam (Kristal Tin) who has low moral consciousness takes the rap for her boyfriend who has committed a crime. After serving her sentence, Matthew Ko (Roger Kwok), a lawyer helps her start afresh by giving her a job at his law firm. Ko initially had a bright future but was crushed when rookie police officer Cheung Lap Fan (Ron Ng) accidentally injures him while on a mission, causing Ko to need to use a wheelchair for the rest of his life. At the same time, this creates an opportunity for the two to break the law. As Ko's hidden conspiracies are exposed, Cheung harbors him out of guilt. Eventually, will Tam be able to make the right choice between love and morality?

Cast

Main Cast
Roger Kwok as Matt Ko Chit Hang (高哲行)
Kristal Tin as May Tam Mei Ching (譚美貞)
Ron Ng as Funny Cheung Lap Fan (張立勳)
Kiki Sheung as Sin Wai Ying (冼慧英)
Louis Cheung as Marco Ma Kai Yuen (馬啟源)
Waise Lee as Henry To Yi Hang (杜以鏗)
Jason Chan Chi-san as Alvis Yung Chi Chung (翁子聰)
Mat Yeung as Lau Yim (劉焱)
Becky Lee as Denise Chiu Man Fai (趙敏暉)
Leanne Li as Scarlet Sze Ka Lei (施嘉莉)
Vivien Yeo as Icy Yeung Man Bing (楊漫冰)

Other cast
Lisa Lau as Gillian To Cheuk Chi (杜綽姿)
May Chan as Lau Miu (劉淼)
Claire Yiu as Yip Ying Sum (葉應心)
Parkman Wong as Siu Wing Kwong (蕭永光)
Derek Wong as Benjamin Ko Chit Ming (高哲明)
Jennifer Shum as Ada
Koo Koon Chung as Kwong King Cheung (鄺景昌)
Joe Tay as Leung Ching Wah (梁正華)
Lau Kong as Ko Lam (高霖)
Gregory Lee as Choi Chi Gung (蔡子峰)
Momo Wu as Lung (綸)
Man Yeung Ching Wah
Burmie Wong

Viewership Ratings

Others
Before the show started filming, the company has already received several complaints over Ron Ng's role over him not being the lead and has been given repetitive roles.

References

External links
 Official Website
 K for TVB

TVB dramas
2014 Hong Kong television series debuts
2014 Hong Kong television series endings